Baby talk is a simplified form of language used by adults when speaking to babies.

Baby talk may also refer to:

Speech of babies
Babbling, a stage where an infant utters sounds of language, but not yet any recognizable words
Baby language, the language of babies
Infantile speech, a speech disorder

Media and entertainment
Babytalk (magazine), an American magazine targeted at new parents
Baby Talk (TV series), a 1991 American sitcom
"Baby Talk" (Jan and Dean song), 1959
"Baby Talk" (Alisha song), 1985
"Baby Talk" (How I Met Your Mother), a 2010 sixth-season episode How I Met Your Mother
Baby Talk, a series of five mixtapes from DaBaby released between 2017 and 2018 (see his mixtapes discography)